The 2005–06 Cypriot Second Division was the 51st season of the Cypriot second-level football league. AEP Paphos won their 1st title.

Format
Fourteen teams participated in the 2005–06 Cypriot Second Division. All teams played against each other twice, once at their home and once away. The team with the most points at the end of the season crowned champions. The first three teams were promoted to 2006–07 Cypriot First Division and the last three teams were relegated to the 2006–07 Cypriot Third Division.

Changes from previous season
Teams promoted to 2005–06 Cypriot First Division
 APOP Kinyras
 APEP
 THOI Lakatamia

Teams relegated from 2004–05 Cypriot First Division
 AEP Paphos
 Alki Larnaca
 Aris Limassol

Teams promoted from 2004–05 Cypriot Third Division
 SEK Agiou Athanasiou
 Elpida Xylofagou
 Iraklis Gerolakkou

Teams relegated to 2005–06 Cypriot Third Division
 ASIL Lysi
 Ermis Aradippou
 Akritas Chlorakas

League standings

Results

See also
 Cypriot Second Division
 2005–06 Cypriot First Division
 2005–06 Cypriot Cup

Sources

Cypriot Second Division seasons
Cyprus
2005–06 in Cypriot football